Restrepia brachypus, the short-column foot restrepia, is a species of orchid occurring from western South America to Venezuela.

References

External links 

brachypus
Orchids of South America
Orchids of Venezuela